Sawotratap Station (STP) is a railway station located in Sawotratap, Gedangan, Sidoarjo Regency. The station is included in the Operation Area VIII Surabaya. Previously, the station only served the Surabaya–Bangil Commuter service.

This station was inaugurated on 9 February 2004, along with the launch of the Delta Express by President Megawati Soekarnoputri. However, since the enactment of the timetable schedule according to 2021 timetable as of 10 February 2021, passenger services at this station have been removed so that now there is not a single commuter train service that stop at this station.

Services
Starting 10 February 2021 there will be no more passenger services at this station.

References

External links

Sidoarjo Regency
Railway stations in East Java
Railway stations opened in 2004
Railway stations closed in  2021
Defunct railway stations in Indonesia
2004 establishments in Indonesia
2021 disestablishments in Indonesia